Virginia has the sixth highest per capita income of any state in the United States of America, at $23,975 (2000).  Its personal per capita income is $33,671 (2003).

Note: Data is from the 2010 United States Census Data and the 2006-2010 American Community Survey 5-Year Estimates.

References

Virginia
Economy of Virginia
Income